The Romania national football team represents Romania in international men's football competition and is administered by the Romanian Football Federation, also known as FRF. They are colloquially known as Tricolorii (The Tricolours).

Romania is one of only four national teams from Europe—the other three being Belgium, France, and Yugoslavia—that took part in the inaugural FIFA World Cup in 1930. Including that participation, Romania has qualified for seven World Cup editions, the latest in 1998. The national team's finest hour came in 1994, when led by playmaker Gheorghe Hagi it defeated Argentina 3–2 in the round of 16, before being eliminated by Sweden on a penalty shoot-out in the quarter-finals.

At the European Championships, Romania's best performance was in 2000 when they advanced to the quarter-finals from a group with Germany, Portugal, and England, before falling to eventual runners-up Italy. They also reached the last eight in 1960 and 1972, and have qualified for a total of five tournaments.

History

Early years

The Romanian Football Federation (Federația Română de Fotbal) was established in October 1909 in Bucharest. Romania played their first international match on 8 June 1922, a 2–1 win over Yugoslavia in Belgrade, being coached by Teofil Moraru. Several temporary coaches were employed, before Moraru resumed control in August 1924, managing the side for nearly four years. Romania enjoyed some success during the 1930s; manager Costel Rădulescu took them to the first three FIFA World Cup tournaments, a feat matched only by Brazil, Belgium and France.

World Cups in the 1930s
At the 1930 World Cup, Romania won their first match against Peru, 3–1, with goals from Adalbert Deșu, Constantin Stanciu, and Nicolae Kovács and Samuel Zauber as goalkeeper, before being thrashed 4–0 by hosts and eventual winners Uruguay.

Romania qualified for the next World Cup in 1934 after beating Yugoslavia 2–1 in a repeat of their first international. At the finals, Romania played only one game in a new knock-out format, losing 2–1 to Czechoslovakia in Trieste, Italy, with Ștefan Dobay scoring their only goal of the tournament.

Romania qualified by default for the 1938 World Cup after their qualifying playoff opponents Egypt withdrew. They suffered a shock defeat in the finals in France, losing to minnows Cuba, who, like Romania, had only qualified due to the withdrawal of their qualifying opponents, the United States. The first match at the Stade du T.O.E.C. in Toulouse ended 3–3 after extra time, but Cuba won the replay four days later 2–1.

1970 World Cup
Despite a 3–0 thrashing by Portugal in Lisbon and two unconvincing draws against unfancied Greece, Romania was able to qualify for the 1970 World Cup in Mexico. Angelo Niculescu's promising side were given the toughest of draws, in Group 3 with holders England, giants Brazil and Czechoslovakia.

A Geoff Hurst goal gave England a narrow victory in Romania's first match at the Estadio Jalisco in Guadalajara. Chances were improved with a 2–1 win over the Czechs. Despite going behind early to a Ladislav Petráš goal, Romania turned it around after half-time with Alexandru Neagu and Florea Dumitrache scoring to give them two vital points. Even then, only a win over the excellent Brazilians would take them into the quarter-finals.

There were rumours before the match that Brazil might prefer Romania to progress than world champions England; despite beating them 1–0 in their previous match in Guadalajara, the South American giants still viewed England as one of its biggest obstacles to tournament victory. But Brazil played some of the best football of the competition, with Pelé scoring twice and a Jairzinho goal in between. Romania battled bravely; Dumitrache pulled the score back to 2–1 before the break and a late Emerich Dembrowski goal made it 3–2, but they were out.

1972 to 1978

On 26 September 1973, under new coach Valentin Stanescu, Romania suffered a significant defeat to East Germany in Leipzig. The East Germans won 2–0 to effectively seal their first ever qualification for the World Cup, which would be held over the border in West Germany. With East Germany scoring a predictable 4–1 win in Albania, Romania were out, despite a huge 9–0 win over Finland in Bucharest.

Romania continued to suffer poor form in the UEFA European Championship. In their qualifying group for the 1976 European Football Championship, they were out-qualified by Spain despite an impressive 1–1 draw in the away match. Romania failed to win matches, drawing twice with Scotland and Spain and dropping points in Denmark with a dismal goalless draw.

Romania were again beaten by Spain for a place in the 1978 World Cup in Argentina. Despite a 1–0 win in Bucharest, Romania lost a bizarre match at home to Yugoslavia 6–4 having led 3–2 at half time. Spain won 1–0 in Belgrade to seal passage to South America.

1984 European Championship

Romania's sole successful qualifying campaign between 1970 and 1990 was for the European Championships in 1984 in France. At the finals, Romania were drawn with regular rivals Spain, holders West Germany and dark horses Portugal. Under head coach Mircea Lucescu, an encouraging opening game in Saint-Étienne saw them draw with the Spanish. Francisco José Carrasco opened the scoring from the penalty spot but Romania equalized before half-time with a goal from Laszlo Bölöni.

Against the Germans in Lens, Marcel Coraș scored an equalizer in the first minute of the second half in response to Rudi Völler's opener, but Völler would score a winning goal. Their last match in Nantes was a must-win match, but Nené's late winner meant Portugal progressed with Spain, who netted a dramatic late winner against West Germany at the Parc des Princes in Paris.

Romania stuttered throughout the rest of the decade, but a stronger squad at the end of the decade saw them qualify for their fifth World Cup in 1990. A win over Denmark in their last match took Emerich Jenei's side to the finals for the first time in 20 years.

Golden Team era

1990 World Cup

Romania's squad was entirely domestic-based, despite an increasing trend for the major sides in Italy and Spain buying up the best foreign talent. Midfielder Ilie Dumitrescu, striker Florin Răducioiu and genius playmaker Gheorghe Hagi, were in the squad.
With world champions Argentina stunned by Cameroon in the tournament's opening match, Romania did their chances no harm with a convincing win over the Soviet Union at the San Nicola in Bari, with Marius Lăcătuș scoring in each half. The result was all the more impressive given the absence of Hagi. There was controversy, however, as Lăcătus' second was a penalty given for a handball by Vagiz Khidiatullin that television replays clearly showed to be some way outside the penalty area.

Romania were the next victims of Cameroon in Bari. Cult hero Roger Milla, 38 years of age, came on as a substitute for Emmanuel Maboang Kessack and scored twice before Gavril Balint pulled one back. Romania needed a point in their last match against improving Argentina at the San Paolo in Naples; Pedro Monzón gave Argentina the lead after an hour, but Balint quickly equalized and Romania held on to reach Round 2.

Against Jack Charlton's Republic of Ireland side in Genoa, Romania did not have the quality to break down a defensive opposition. Daniel Timofte was the only player to miss in the penalty shoot-out – his kick saved by Packie Bonner – and Romania were out.

1994 World Cup

Romania missed out on Euro 1992. Scotland qualified after Romania drew a must-win last match in Sofia against Bulgaria, with Nasko Sirakov's equalizer sealing their fate.

Romania was successful, however, in reaching another World Cup in the United States in 1994. Despite losing in Belgium and suffering a heavy 5–2 defeat in Czechoslovakia, Romania went into their last match at Cardiff Arms Park with Wales needing a win to pip them to a place in the finals. Goals from Gheorghe Hagi and Dean Saunders meant the game was finely balanced, before Wales were awarded a penalty. Paul Bodin of Swindon Town stepped up but hit the woodwork and Romania went on to win 2–1, Florin Răducioiu's late goal proving unnecessary as Czechoslovakia dropped a point in Belgium and were eliminated.

At the finals, Romania were one of the most entertaining teams in the early stages, with Gheorghe Hagi, Florin Răducioiu and Ilie Dumitrescu on form. Romania beat Colombia at the Pasadena Rose Bowl in Los Angeles 3–1. All but one of Romania's games took place in California, and they were awarded the advantage of playing most of their games in Los Angeles. Răducioiu opened the scoring before Hagi scored a spectacular second from wide on the left touchline. Adolfo Valencia pulled one back with a headed goal just before half-time, but Romania held on and Răducioiu sealed the win with a late third.

In Detroit's indoor Pontiac Silverdome, the temperature soared due to the greenhouse effect in the indoor arena. Switzerland, acclimatized after having already played the hosts there, outran Romania in the second half and turned a 1–1 half time score into a surprising 4–1 win. Romania responded by beating the hosts 1–0 in Pasadena with an early Dan Petrescu goal.

In the Round of 16 knockout stage they faced Argentina in Los Angeles who were shorn of Diego Maradona who was thrown out of the tournament for taking drugs. Răducioiu, suspended, was hardly missed, as coach Anghel Iordănescu pushed Dumitrescu forward to play as a striker and the player responded by scoring twice in the first 20 minutes, one a superbly subtle left foot flick from a right-wing Hagi cross slotted between the Argentine defenders. In between, Gabriel Batistuta scored a penalty, but after half-time Romania netted a superb third on the counterattack, with Hagi beating goalkeeper Luis Islas. Abel Balbo pulled one back, but Romania held on for a shock win.

Romania would suffer penalty heartbreak again, in the quarter-final against Sweden in San Francisco. With just 13 minutes to play, a tight match opened up as Sweden's Thomas Brolin scored from a clever free-kick move, the ball passed outside the Romanian wall by Håkan Mild for Brolin to smash in. Iordănescu threw caution to the wind and the returning Răducioiu found a late equalizer, again from a free-kick move but this time down to a deflection and a failure of the Swedes to clear. In extra time Răducioiu scored again after a mistake by Patrik Andersson, but Sweden then scored their own late equalizer as giant striker Kennet Andersson climbed above goalkeeper Florin Prunea to head home a long ball. Prunea had come in after two matches to replace Bogdan Stelea, whose confidence was shattered by the 4–1 loss to the Swiss. In the shoot-out, Dan Petrescu and Miodrag Belodedici had their kicks saved by Thomas Ravelli and Sweden went through.

Euro 1996
At Euro 1996, held in England, Romania arrived as a highly thought-of and popular team but had a nightmare. Iordănescu's side were based in the north east, with their first two games at St James' Park in Newcastle. Against France, they lost to a Christophe Dugarry header reminiscent of Kennet Andersson's two years earlier, beating the goalkeeper to a lofted through ball. An early goal from Bulgaria striker Hristo Stoichkov at St James' Park put Romania on the back foot in Euro 1996, but Dorinel Munteanu appeared to have kept Romania in the match – and in the tournament – with a thunderbolt that hit the bar, bounced over the line, and back out. Referee Peter Mikkelsen merely waved play on, however, and Romania went on to lose the game 1–0 a defeat which sent them out of the tournament. English manager Harry Redknapp was in the crowd that day, and later said that it convinced him there and then that goal-line technology was needed in football. Romania finally scored in their last game, Florin Răducioiu equalizing an early goal by Spain's Javier Manjarín. Spain had to win to qualify with France at the expense of Bulgaria and did so when Guillermo Amor stooped to head a late winner. Romania exited in total shame, with no points and tons of regrets of what could have been.

1998 World Cup
Despite a poor performance at Euro 1996, Romania impressed in qualifying, finishing ten points clear of the Republic of Ireland and were seeded for the final tournament of the 1998 World Cup thanks to their strong showing in 1994. Despite being drawn in a group with England, progression to the next round was expected in light of a declining Colombia and minnows Tunisia.

Adrian Ilie scored the only goal with a fine chip in their first match against Colombia at Lyon's Stade Gerland.
In Toulouse, they met an England side starting with prodigal striker Michael Owen on the bench, with Teddy Sheringham preferred alongside Alan Shearer. A mistake by Tony Adams was punished by Viorel Moldovan, who played for Coventry City, before Owen came on to claim an equalizer. But Romania won with a wonderful late goal from Dan Petrescu, also playing in England with Chelsea, fighting off his club teammate Graeme le Saux and nutmegging goalkeeper David Seaman.

The next match was against Tunisia. Romania decided to bleach their hair before the match. Despite England–Colombia being the more decisive game, the Stade de France in Paris was an 80,000-strong sell out and the crowd were nearly rewarded with a shock as Skander Souayah scored an early penalty to give the north Africans the lead. Romania needed a point to win the group and, crucially, avoid Argentina in the round of 16, and got it when Moldovan volleyed a late equalizer. It did them little good, however, as in the round of 16 match at Bordeaux against Croatia, Davor Šuker scored a twice-taken penalty to eliminate Romania.

Euro 2000

Romania had a strong qualifying campaign, winning a tough Group 7 with Portugal, Slovakia, Hungary, Azerbaijan and Liechtenstein. The Romanians impressed, never losing and winning seven times, including a big upset in Porto after defeating Portugal thanks to a late goal scored by Dorinel Munteanu. In Bucharest, the score finished 1–1.

At Euro 2000, held in Belgium and the Netherlands, Romania was facing a very difficult group against 1996 champions Germany, semi-finalists England and Portugal. The chances for the Romanians to qualify through quarter-finals were seen as slim.

Romania, however, started brightly against the Germans in Liège, with Viorel Moldovan scoring from close range. A long-range Mehmet Scholl equalizer meant they had to be content with a point and their position looked shaky after Costinha headed a last minute winner for Portugal in their second match.

Emerich Jenei, back as coach, threw caution to the wind in the last match in Charleroi against England, a match which Romania had to win. Defender Cristian Chivu's cross went in off the post in the 22nd minute but, despite Romania dominating, England led at half-time through an Alan Shearer penalty and a late Michael Owen goal after he rounded goalkeeper Bogdan Stelea to score a tap-in, both in the last five minutes of the half. Romania attacked after the break and were quickly rewarded; Dorinel Munteanu punishing a poor punch from Nigel Martyn, a late replacement for injured goalkeeper David Seaman, to equalize three minutes after the restart. England cracked under the pressure. Unable to retain possession or pose an attacking threat, they fell deep and late on Phil Neville, playing out of position at left-back, conceded a penalty scored by Ioan Ganea in the 89th minute.

Romania's relief was tempered by tough opposition in the last eight, and Italy, who would end up seconds from being crowned European champions in an agonizing final, comfortably saw them off 2–0 in Brussels. Francesco Totti and Filippo Inzaghi scoring towards the end of the first half. In the 35th minute, Gheorghe Hagi, in his final international tournament, hit the woodwork with goalkeeper Francesco Toldo stranded off his line and, after the break, was sent off for diving. Romania's tournament was over and Emerich Jenei left his job as coach again.

2000s – World Cup dry spell
Romania failed to qualify for the next three major tournaments. They drew Slovenia, who had been surprise qualifiers for Euro 2000 in a playoff for a place in the 2002 World Cup in South Korea and Japan. A narrow 2–1 deficit – having led through a Marius Niculae goal – after the first leg in Ljubljana was not irretrievable. With fans' hero Gheorghe Hagi now coaching the side, they were confident of getting the win they needed in Bucharest against the Balkan upstarts, but Slovenia took the lead before the hour through Mladen Rudonja. Right wing-back Cosmin Contra quickly equalized but Romania could not find the goal they needed to force extra time and Slovenia, with maverick manager Srečko Katanec, were in a major tournament again.

Euro 2004
Romania were confident of qualifying for the tournament, drawn in Group 2 with seeds Denmark, Norway, Bosnia and Herzegovina and minnows Luxembourg, with Anghel Iordanescu back as coach. Despite a good start – a 3–0 win away to Bosnia in Sarajevo – Romania stuttered. Steffen Iversen's late goal gave Norway a surprise win in Bucharest and they were stunned at home by the Danes, 5–2, with Thomas Gravesen scoring a spectacular goal from around 50 yards out, despite leading twice. They recovered slightly, completing a double over the Bosnians and earning a point in Oslo, but conceded a cutting injury time equalizer in Denmark to draw 2–2. It was decisive, as they now required Norway to fail to win at home to Luxembourg to stand any realistic chance of qualifying. Eventually, the Danes got a point in Bosnia to scrape through a tight group, with Norway going to a play-off with Spain.

2006 World Cup
Romania were put in a difficult group for the qualifying tournament for the 2006 World Cup in Germany.  The Netherlands and the Czech Republic were favourites to qualify, then ranked first and second in Europe respectively. Early wins over Finland and Macedonia were unconvincing, and they were some way behind the two leaders by the time they earned a good 2–0 home win over the Czechs. Despite a record of eight wins, three losses and one draw, they finished third behind the Dutch and the Czechs and missed out on another major tournament.

Euro 2008
Romania were drawn in a group with group favourites the Netherlands and tough opponents Bulgaria for Euro 2008 qualifying. Romania, however, had a good qualifying campaign, losing only away against Bulgaria and beating the Netherlands 1–0 at home with a goal scored by Dorin Goian from a suspicious off-side position not seen by referee Kyros Vassaras. On 17 October 2007, Romania became the fourth team to qualify for Euro 2008, the nation's first international tournament since Euro 2000. Coincidentally, Victor Pițurcă also led Romania to qualification for Euro 2000, only to sit back and let Emerich Jenei coach the team in the final tournament; this time, however, he stayed in the role, the first time he coached a national team in the final stages of a tournament.

Romania was drawn in the so-called "Group of death" alongside the Netherlands, world champions Italy and France, runners-up in the 2006 World Cup. Romania started with a 0–0 draw against a lacklustre France while Italy were soundly beaten by the Netherlands, 3–0. In their next match, against Italy, Adrian Mutu opened the scoring early in the second half. Their lead was a very short one, however, as Italy's Christian Panucci scored a minute later off of a corner kick. Nearing the end of the match, Daniel Niculae earned a penalty for his team, but goalkeeper Gianluigi Buffon saved the subsequent Mutu penalty, leaving Romania with two points and needing a win against the Netherlands, who defeated France 4–1 that same evening. The Netherlands beat Romania 2–0 in the final game of the group, which meant that Italy joined the Netherlands in the quarter-finals and Romania finished third, ahead of France.

2010 World Cup 

Romania were drawn into the UEFA qualifying round for the 2010 World Cup alongside France, Serbia, Austria, Lithuania and the Faroe Islands. Although Romania were seeded in the second pot, suggesting that they were a strong challenge for the first place in the group, they eventually finished fifth, above only the Faroe Islands. Their campaign was a disaster that began with a 3–0 home loss to Lithuania and included a 5–0 trashing in Belgrade by Serbia. Furthermore, various problems were caused during the poor campaign, such as the retirement from international football of Cosmin Contra, Mirel Rădoi and Adrian Mutu (the latter would later be recalled after a year's absence). Also, coach Victor Pițurcă resigned and was replaced by Răzvan Lucescu.

Euro 2012
In Euro 2012 qualifying, Romania was drawn into Group D along with France, Bosnia and Herzegovina, Belarus, Albania and Luxembourg. Although the team initially seemed prepared to continue their awful form from their disastrous World Cup campaign, beginning with a 1–1 draw with Pot 5 members Albania and following up with a goalless draw with Belarus and a pair of losses to France and Bosnia and Herzegovina, the team was able to rebound somewhat and register their first two victories. The first was an expected win against Luxembourg but the second was an important win in the rematch against Bosnia and Herzegovina. Romania's last good result came when they battled group favorite France to a goalless draw before ending the campaign the way it began – two disappointing draws with Albania and Belarus. They finished qualification in a distant third place and only one point ahead of Belarus.

2014 World Cup
Romania was drawn into the 2014 FIFA World Cup qualifying round with the Netherlands, Turkey, Hungary, Estonia and Andorra. Romania, Turkey and Hungary were expected to battle it out for second place behind the Netherlands. They made an impressive start with a 2–0 away win in Estonia followed by a 4–0 win at home against modest Andorra and another away win in Turkey (1–0). After that, Romania was defeated by Netherlands, both at home and away, and managed to secure only a draw in Hungary, in between. Romania started the last part of the campaign with a victory at home, against Hungary, but was defeated by Turkey. The last two match days were decisive, with Romania securing its place in the play-off with two wins, against Andorra and Estonia, while qualification rivals Turkey and Hungary were both defeated by the winner of the group, the Netherlands. Romania were drawn to play Greece for a place in the World Cup finals, but a 3–1 loss in Greece and a 1–1 home draw ended its run.

Euro 2016
 
For the qualifying stage of the Euro 2016 Romania was drawn into Group F along with Greece, Hungary, Finland, Northern Ireland and the Faroe Islands. Romania began its first successful qualification campaign since 2008 with a win over group favourites Greece before following up with a 1–1 draw with Pot 2 member Hungary and a 2–0 win over Finland. Despite the initial success, Romania decided to part with coach Victor Pițurcă by mutual consent. Anghel Iordănescu came out of retirement to return to coach Romania for a third time.

Under Iordănescu, Romania was able to follow up with comfortable 2–0 win over surprise force Northern Ireland and, despite a disappointing 1–0 win over the Faroe Islands and a 0–0 draw in the return game against Northern Ireland, Romania remained on top of Group F, one point above Northern Ireland and three points above third-placed Hungary. After a goalless draw in the match against Hungary in Budapest, however, the team fell back on the second place, one point behind Northern Ireland and three above Hungary, still placed third. Following a 1–1 draw clinched in overtime at home against Finland, Romania secured their spot at the final tournament in the last game after a confident 3–0 win in the Faroe Islands. Romania finished the qualification group second, one point behind group winners Northern Ireland, completing their first successful qualification campaign in eight years undefeated after five wins and five draws. With only two goals conceded, Romania had the best defence in the qualifiers, and was named ”a possible threat” by multiple people.

Romania advanced to Euro 2016, where they were drawn in Group A, being named to play the opening match against the hosts France. The match began better for the Romanian side, who almost scored the first goal of the tournament in the fourth minute, after Bogdan Stancu tricked the French defence at a corner kick executed by his co-national Nicușor Stanciu and his shot was narrowly saved by the French goalkeeper Hugo Lloris. Shortly after the half-time, the match began being dominated by France, who scored the first goal of the tournament after a header of Olivier Giroud in the 57th minute. Not more than eight minutes later, Nicușor Stanciu was fouled by Patrice Evra in the French box, the Hungarian referee Viktor Kassai giving Romania a penalty which the same Bogdan Stancu scoring for the Romanian side. With the match coming to an end, just after Romania narrowly missed an opportunity after a free kick, Dimitri Payet shot hard from outside the box and scored France's second goal, crushing Romania's dream of a perfect start in Euro.

In the second match, Romania faced Switzerland, in a match that began with the Swiss side dominating. In the 17th minute, Alexandru Chipciu was fouled in the box, the second penalty of the tournament being accorded again to Romania. The same Bogdan Stancu went on and scored, giving an advantage for the Romanian side. With the Romanians leading at half-time, hopes began to rise again. Just after Switzerland almost scored an own goal, Admir Mehmedi scored for an equalizer in the 57th minute. The score remained the same and the match ended 1-1.

With one point accumulated and on the third place in the group before the final match, Romania needed a victory against Albania in order to be among the first four best-third-placed teams and to qualify further in Euro. The match began good for the Romanian side, but Armando Sadiku's header in the 43rd minute went past Ciprian Tătărușanu, giving Albania the lead and their first ever goal in a tournament. The despondent Romanian side failed to score in this match, with Florin Andone striking the post in the 76th minute. The negative score meant that Romania ended on the last place of the group, ending their Euro dream with no victory and after one draw, two defeats, two goals scored (both from penalties) and four conceded, with only one point, the poor results making the manager Anghel Iordănescu to resign before the matches for the 2018 FIFA World Cup qualifiers began three months later.

2018 World Cup
For the qualification round, Romania was drawn in Group E, being in Pot 1 for the first time after a long time. Romania's two strongest opponents appear to be Denmark and Poland; its other opponents are Montenegro, Armenia and Kazakhstan. The qualifying campaign started with a 1–1 home draw against Montenegro followed by a thrashing away victory against Armenia, 0–5. In the next match, Romania recorded another draw (0–0), against Kazakhstan. The last match played in 2016 was a 0–3 defeat against Poland, with Robert Lewandowski scoring a double. After an uninspiring campaign, Romania ended in the fourth place in Group E with 13 points. After 8 of the 10 games, due to lackluster performances, coach Christoph Daum was fired and replaced with a promising new coach, Cosmin Contra.

2018–19 Nations League
Romania's poor performance previously meant that the country had to participate in the 2018–19 UEFA Nations League C, where they were grouped again with Montenegro, alongside neighbor Serbia and minnows Lithuania. Romania managed an acceptable performance, with the team beat Lithuania and Montenegro, but three draws, two against Serbia, meant that Romania was unable to gain the top spot or a direct playoff ticket. However, when the UEFA revised the format, Romania was officially promoted to 2020–21 UEFA Nations League B.

Euro 2020

Romania was drawn in a group including the national teams of Spain, Sweden, and Norway alongside Malta and the Faroe Islands in UEFA Euro 2020 qualifying. In the opening game, Romania suffered a 1–2 away defeat to Sweden. This was followed by an easy 4–1 victory over the Faroe Islands and a 2–2 draw with Norway in Oslo, two victories over Malta and a 1–2 loss at home to Spain. Eventually, Romania kept on track by beating Faroe Islands 3–0 away, but it was later followed with a disappointing 1–1 home draw to the Norwegians. This had reduced significantly their chances of automatic qualification, as they had to meet strong Swedish and Spanish sides for the two remaining competitive games. A 0–2 home defeat to Sweden ensured that Romania would be unable to finish in the automatic qualification places. Romania eventually qualified for the playoff, but their performance cost Cosmin Contra his coaching position, as he was sacked prior to the playoff. Romania went on to lose 1–2 to Iceland, and was eliminated from UEFA Euro 2020 contention.

World Cup 2022
For the 2022 FIFA World Cup hosted in Qatar, Romania was drawn in UEFA Group J, along with Germany, Armenia, North Macedonia, Iceland, and Liechtenstein.  Romania failed to qualify, finishing in third in the group.

Team image

Rivalry

Romania has a long-standing rivalry with its neighbours Hungary. The rivalry between the two nations dates back from the Treaty of Trianon, where Hungary lost Transylvania to Romania, after World War I. Usually flares and matches are  thrown by the two sides and that often ends in a fight between the Hungarian and Romanian supporters, however, recently also before the matches conflicts have emerged outside the stadium. These was seen as they shared the same group in 1982 FIFA World Cup qualifying (The other teams of the group were England, Switzerland and Norway), UEFA Euro 2000 qualifying (The other teams of the group were Portugal, Slovakia, Azerbaijan and Liechtenstein), 2002 World Cup qualifying (The other teams of the group were Italy, Georgia and Lithuania), 2014 World Cup qualifying (The other teams of the group were Netherlands, Turkey, Estonia and Andorra) and UEFA Euro 2016 qualifying (The other teams of the group were Greece, Northern Ireland, Finland and Faroe Islands).

Romania has also a football rivalry against Greece, because it is the team that has been met the most times in their history (36 times), after 37 matches against Yugoslavia, which does not exist anymore. Romania has won 18 matches and Greece has won 8 matches (10 matches between them, have been ended in draw).

Kits

Romania's kits have been supplied by Spanish company Joma from 2015, which replaced Adidas following a three-decade contract. In 2017, the Romanian Football Federation announced its first brand identity and a new kit; the new emblem references the coat of arms of all five Romanian provinces with the intention to symbolise the unity of Romania.

Home stadium 

The Romania national team mainly plays its home games at the Arena Națională in Bucharest, the largest stadium in the country, which was opened in 2011 and has a capacity of 55,600 seats. The National Stadium is a Category 4 venue and hosted the 2012 UEFA Europa League Final and UEFA Euro 2020 matches.

Other games, including not only friendlies but also FIFA World Cup and UEFA European Championship qualifiers, have been played in recent years at other venues such as the Cluj Arena (Cluj-Napoca), the Ion Oblemenco Stadium (Craiova), the Steaua Stadium (Bucharest), or the smaller Ilie Oană (Ploiești), Dr. Constantin Rădulescu (Cluj-Napoca), and Rapid-Giulești (Bucharest) stadiums.

Media coverage
Romania's UEFA Nations League games, major tournament qualifiers and friendlies are to be televised on Pro TV up until 2022. Between 2008 and 2014, Antena 1 had the rights to broadcast the country's home matches, friendlies and qualifiers. From 2014 to 2018, Romania's qualifying matches for the European Championship and the World Cup, plus two pre-Euro and one post-Euro friendly match were taken over by TVR. The friendly matches that were not broadcast by TVR were taken over by Pro TV. In March 2019, the latter took over all broadcasts of Romania's fixtures from TVR, with the effective broadcasting starting in September 2018.

Results and fixtures

2022

2023

Current technical staff

Managers with the most appearances

Coaching history

Below is the full list of all former coaches for Romania from 1922 onwards:

  Teofil Moraru (1922–1923)
  Costel Rădulescu (1923)
  Adrian Suciu (1923–1924)
  Teofil Moraru (1924–1928)
  Costel Rădulescu (1928–1934)
  Josef Uridil (1934)
  Peter Farmer (1934–1935)
  Costel Rădulescu (1935–1938)
  Alexandru Săvulescu 1938)
  Liviu Iuga (1938–1939)
  Virgil Economu (1939–1940)
  Liviu Iuga (1940)
  Virgil Economu (1941–1942)
  Ion Lăpușneanu (1942–1943)
  Emerich Vogl (1943)
  Coloman Braun-Bogdan (1945)
  Virgil Economu (1946)
  Colea Vâlcov (1947)
  Emerich Vogl (1947)
  Francisc Ronnay (1947)
  Emerich Vogl (1947)
  Colea Vâlcov (1948)
  Petre Steinbach (1948)
  Iuliu Baratky (1948)
  Emerich Vogl (1948)
  Colea Vâlcov (1949)
  Emerich Vogl (1949)
  Ion Mihăilescu (1949)
  Gheorghe Albu (1950)
  Volodea Vâlcov (1950)
  Emerich Vogl (1950–1952)
  Gheorghe Popescu I (1951–1957)
  Augustin Botescu (1958–1960)
  Gheorghe Popescu I (1961)
  Constantin Teașcă (1962)
  Gheorghe Popescu I (1962)
  Silviu Ploeșteanu (1962–1963)
  Ilie Oană (1965–1966)
  Bazil Marian (1967)
  Ilie Oană (1967)
  Angelo Niculescu (1967)
  Constantin Teașcă (1967)
  Angelo Niculescu (1967–1971)
  Gheorghe Ola (1972)
  Angelo Niculescu (1972)
  Gheorghe Ola (1972)
  Valentin Stănescu (1973–1975)
  Cornel Drăgușin (1975)
  Ștefan Kovács (1976–1979)
  Florin Halagian (1979)
  Constantin Cernăianu (1979)
  Ștefan Kovács (1980)
  Valentin Stănescu (1980–1981)
  Mircea Lucescu (1981–1986)
  Emerich Jenei (1986–1990)
  Gheorghe Constantin (1990)
  Mircea Rădulescu (1990–1992)
  Cornel Dinu (1992–1993)
  Anghel Iordănescu (1993–1998)
  Victor Pițurcă (1998–1999)
  Emerich Jenei (2000)
  Ladislau Bölöni (2000–2001)
  Gheorghe Hagi (2001)
  Anghel Iordănescu (2001–2004)
  Victor Pițurcă (2005–2009)
  Răzvan Lucescu (2009–2011)
  Victor Pițurcă (2011–2014)
  Anghel Iordănescu (2014–2016)
  Christoph Daum (2016–2017)
  Cosmin Contra (2017–2019)
  Mirel Rădoi( (2019–2021)
  Edward Iordănescu (2022–present)

Players

Current squad
The following players were called up for the UEFA Euro 2024 qualifying matches against Andorra and Belarus on 25 and 28 March 2023.

Caps and goals correct as of 20 November 2022, after the match against Moldova.

Recent call-ups
The following players have been called up for the team within the last 12 months.

 

Notes
INJ = Player withdrew from the squad due to an injury
COV = Player withdrawn from the squad due to positive COVID-19 test
RET = Player who retired from national team
WD = Player withdrew from the squad
SUS = Player suspended

Statistics 

Players in bold are still active with Romania.

Most appearances

Top goalscorers

Youngest debutants
As of 15 November 2021, the five youngest debutants for Romania are:

Competitive record

FIFA World Cup

 Champions   Runners-up   Third Place   Fourth Place  

**Denotes draws including knockout matches decided on penalty kicks. Darker color indicates win, normal color indicates loss.

UEFA European Championship

*Denotes draws including knockout matches decided on penalty kicks.
**Red border color indicates tournament was held on home soil.

UEFA Nations League record

Summer Olympics
Football at the Summer Olympics was first played officially in 1908. The Olympiads between 1896 and 1980 was only open for amateur players. The 1984 and 1988 tournaments were open to players with no appearances in the FIFA World Cup. After the 1988 Olympics, the football event was changed into a tournament for U23 teams, with a maximum of three older players. See Romania Olympic football team for competition records from 1992 until present day.

All-time head-to-head record
Last match updated was against  on 20 November 2022.

FIFA ranking history
The following is a chart of yearly averages of Romania's FIFA ranking.

Honours 

 FIFA World Cup
 Quarter-finals (1): 1994
 Round of 16 (4): 1934, 1938, 1990, 1998
 UEFA European Football Championship
 Quarter-finals (1): 2000
 Football at the Summer Olympics
 Fifth-place (1): 1964
 Round of 16 (1): 1924
 Balkan Cup:
 Winners (4) – Record: 1929–31, 1933, 1936, 1977–80
 Runners-up (1): 1973–76

See also

 Romania Olympic football team
 Romania national under-21 football team
 Romania national under-20 football team
 Romania national under-19 football team
 Romania national under-17 football team 
 Romania national futsal team
 Romania national beach soccer team
 Romania women's national football team
 Hungary–Romania football rivalry

References

Further reading

External links

Official website
Official Facebook page
RomanianSoccer.ro – Romanian National Team Archive
Romania national team /details 1922–/
RSSSF archive of results 1922–2006
RSSSF archive of most capped players and highest goalscorers
RSSSF archive of coaches 1922–1999

 
European national association football teams
Football in Romania